This is a list of military aircraft in active service with the Pakistan Armed Forces.

Pakistan Air Force

Pakistan Army Aviation Corps

Pakistan Naval Air Arm

Pakistan Coast Guards

Pakistan Maritime Security Agency

See also 

 Pakistan Air Force
 Pakistan Army Aviation Corps
 Pakistan Naval Air Arm

References

External links 
 Pakistan Air Force
 Pakistan Army
 Pakistan Navy

Pakistani military aircraft